Vasi or Wassi, in Iran, may refer to:
 Wassi- Branch of Bhati Tribe
 Vasi-ye Olya
 Vasi-ye Sofla